Brunswick High School (BHS) is an American public high school located in Brunswick, Frederick County, Maryland, United States. The school serves the communities of Brunswick, Burkittsville, Jefferson, Knoxville, Point of Rocks, and Rosemont. There have been plans to demolish the current building and to build a new high school nearby.

Overview
The school is near the Virginia border near the Potomac River, just off of Maryland Route 464, and a couple miles southeast of U.S. Route 340.

The current building was constructed in 1965. There are two gymnasiums, and a vocational technology wing including auto mechanics. Brunswick High School has the distinction of being the only school in Frederick County besides CTC with an automechanical program. The original Brunswick High School was built on 4th Avenue around 1911, but it burned down in 1928.

Students

Brunswick High School's graduation rate has been very high over the past 12 years. In 2007 the school graduated 97.04%, though it peaked in 2004 at 98.82% and had a low of 92.99% in 2000.

Demographics 
Brunswick's demographic breakdown is as follows:

Population
The school's enrollment grew rapidly between 1993 and 2003 and has curved downward somewhat since then.

Music

Marching Band
The Brunswick High Marching Railroaders compete in the Maryland Marching Band Association. In previous years, they competed in the Tournament of Bands Circuit. 
 
Awards and Recognitions:

TOB Region 5 Champions - 2013-2019

Tax Slayer Bowl Game Half-time: 2016

Indoor Percussion

In combination with Tuscarora High School, to make Western Frederick Indoor Percussion, they compete in the Keystone Indoor Drill Association (KIDA).

Awards:

2013 - Gold Class Indoor Percussion champions (as Brunswick High School)

2015 - White Class Indoor Percussion Champions (as Western Frederick)

Indoor Color Guard

In combination with Tuscarora High School, to make Western Frederick Indoor Color Guard, they compete in the Keystone  Indoor Drill Association (KIDA).

Theatre

 Fall 2015 Play - A Christmas Caroll
 Spring 2016 Musical - Beauty and The Beast
 Fall 2016 Play - Its a Wonderful Life
 Spring 2017 Musical - The Little Mirmaid
 Fall 2017 Play - The Matchmaker
 Spring 2018 Musical - 
 Fall 2018 Play - Clue: On Stage
 Spring 2019  Musical - Mama Mia
 Fall 2019 Play - Clue: On Stage
 Spring 2020  Musical - Mama Mia
 Fall 2020 Play - Lights Out: Old Time Radio Drama
 Spring 2021 Musical - The Theory of Relativity: A Musical About Connection
 Fall 2021 Play - Almost, Maine

Sports

State Champions

 2021 - Boys' Soccer
 2021 - Boys' Cross Country
 2016 - Boys' Baseball
 2015 - Boys' Baseball
 2014 - Boys' Soccer
 2013 - Unified Bocce
 2012 - Boys' Soccer
 1996 - Baseball 
 1996 - Girls' Basketball 
 1993 - Girls' Cross Country 
 1992 - Baseball
 1992 - Girls' Cross Country
 1991 - Baseball
 1991 - Girls' Cross Country
 1990 - Baseball
 1990 - Boys' Soccer 
 1989 - Boys' Cross Country 
 1985 - Girls' Cross Country
 1983 - Girls' Cross Country
 1982 - Girls' Cross Country
 1977 - Boys' Basketball 
 1966 - Boys' Cross Country
 1965 - Boys' Cross Country
 1948 - Boys' Cross Country
 1947 - Boys' Cross Country
 1946 - Boys' Cross Country

See also
List of high schools in Maryland
Frederick County Public Schools

References and notes

External links
Brunswick High School
Brunswick High School alumni

Public high schools in Maryland
Educational institutions established in 1911
Schools in Frederick County, Maryland
1911 establishments in Maryland